Volha Mikhaylovna Tsander (born 18 May 1976 in Hrodna) is a female hammer thrower from Belarus. Her personal best throw is 76.66 metres, achieved in July 2005 in Minsk.

Achievements

External links

sports-reference

1976 births
Living people
Sportspeople from Grodno
Belarusian female hammer throwers
Athletes (track and field) at the 2000 Summer Olympics
Athletes (track and field) at the 2004 Summer Olympics
Olympic athletes of Belarus